Emperor Otto may refer to:

Otto I, Holy Roman Emperor (962-973)
Otto II, Holy Roman Emperor (967-983)
Otto III, Holy Roman Emperor (983-1002)
Otto IV, Holy Roman Emperor (1198–1215)

See also
Otto von Habsburg, former pretender to the throne of the Austrian Empire
 Otto